Delfim Ribeiro Guedes (Maria da Fé, state of Minas Gerais, May 2, 1908 - February 23, 1985) was a Brazilian bishop.

He was the first bishop of both the Roman Catholic Diocese of Leopoldina and the Roman Catholic Diocese of São João del-Rei.

References 
Brazilian bishops
1908 births
1985 deaths

Catholic bishops in Brazil